"Look on the Floor" is a dance-pop song written by Sara Dallin, Keren Woodward, H. Korpi, M. Wollo, M. Malavasi and S. Micheli for Bananarama's album Drama (2005). The song was produced by Korpi and BlackCell. Contained in "Look on the Floor" is an interpolation of the chorus to the 1983 Italo disco song "Hypnotic Tango" by My Mine.

"Look on the Floor" was released as the second single from Drama in 2005 and peaked at number 26 in the United Kingdom, where it became their twenty-fifth - and, to date, final - top 40 single. Later in the year it was released internationally and peaked at number twelve in the Spanish singles chart.

Although the single was not released in the United States, it peaked at number two on the U.S. Hot Dance Club Play chart strictly based on nightclub play of the import single (a rare occurrence for the U.S. dance chart), becoming Bananarama's biggest club hit since "Venus" in 1986. "Look on the Floor" soon caught on to radio, peaking at number five on the Hot Dance Airplay chart. The dance chart success of this single prompted an official release in the United States of Bananarama's previous single "Move in My Direction" in August 2006.

The Angel City remix of the song was included on the soundtrack to You Don't Mess with the Zohan.

Music video
The music video features Dallin and Woodward shot in an all white studio with an arrangement of white boxes and cylinders. Their scenes are intercut with a dance performance by three male dancers in front of mirrors. It was directed by Tim Royes.

Formats and track listings
These are the formats and track listings of major single releases of "Look on the Floor".

UK CD single #1
"Look on the Floor (Hypnotic Tango)"
"Live in the Sun"

UK CD single #2
"Look on the Floor (Hypnotic Tango)" (Radio edit) – 3:28
"Look on the Floor (Hypnotic Tango)" (Solasso remix) – 6:43
"Look on the Floor (Hypnotic Tango)" (Soul Seekerz remix) – 7:29
Remixed by Julian Napolitano, Simon Langford & Andrew Galea
"Look on the Floor (Hypnotic Tango)" (Angel City Alternative Radio edit)
Remixed by Hugo Zentveld (aka DJ Renegade) & Aldwin Oomen 
"Look on the Floor (Hypnotic Tango)" (Yomanda remix) – 7:33
Remixed by Paul Masterson
"Look on the Floor (Hypnotic Tango)" music video

UK DVD single
"Look on the Floor (Hypnotic Tango)"

Australian CD single
"Look on the Floor (Hypnotic Tango)" (Radio edit) – 3:28
"Look on the Floor (Hypnotic Tango)" (Angel City Extended Remix) – 5:45
Remixed by Hugo Zentveld (aka DJ Renegade) & Aldwin Oomen
"Look on the Floor (Hypnotic Tango)" (Solasso Remix) – 6:43
"Look on the Floor (Hypnotic Tango)" (Yomanda Remix) – 7:33
Remixed by Paul Masterson
"Look on the Floor (Hypnotic Tango)" (Soul Seekerz Remix) – 7:29
Remixed by Julian Napolitano, Simon Langford & Andrew Galea
"Look on the Floor (Hypnotic Tango)" (Solasso Remix Dub) – 5:51
"Look on the Floor (Hypnotic Tango)" (Soul Seekerz Remix Dub) – 7:29
Remixed by Julian Napolitano, Simon Langford & Andrew Galea
"Look on the Floor (Hypnotic Tango)" (Yomanda Remix Dub) – 7:32
Remixed by Paul Masterson

Charts

Weekly charts

Year-end charts

References

2005 songs
2005 singles
Bananarama songs
Songs written by Sara Dallin
Songs written by Keren Woodward
Songs written by Henrik Korpi
Song recordings produced by Korpi & Blackcell
Songs written by Mathias Johansson (producer)